Innale Innu is a 1977 Indian Malayalam film, directed by I. V. Sasi and produced by Thiruppathi Chettiyar. The film stars Prem Nazir, Sheela, Kaviyoor Ponnamma and Jose Prakash in the lead roles. The film has musical score by G. Devarajan.

Cast

Prem Nazir as Gopi
Sheela as Thulasi
M. G. Soman as Thulasi's husband
Sukumaran
Ravikumar as Rajan
Vidhubala as Radha
Meena
Kaviyoor Ponnamma as Radha's Mother
Jose Prakash as Achutha Kuruppu (Thulasi's father)
Sankaradi as Nanu Nair
Sreelatha Namboothiri
Bahadoor as Rajan's father
Janardanan as Chadran
Kuthiravattam Pappu

Soundtrack
The music was composed by G. Devarajan and the lyrics were written by Bichu Thirumala and Chirayinkeezhu Ramakrishnan Nair. The song "Chembakam Poothulanja" is written by Bichu Thirumala only.

References

External links
 

1977 films
Indian drama films
1970s Malayalam-language films
Films directed by I. V. Sasi
Films with screenplays by A. Sheriff